Vladimíra Uhlířová (born 4 May 1978) is a retired Czech tennis player.

In her career, she won five doubles titles on the WTA Tour, as well as 17 doubles titles on the ITF Women's Circuit. In October 2003, she reached her best singles ranking of world No. 400. In October 2007, she peaked at No. 18 in the doubles rankings.

Uhlířová reached the semifinals of the 2007 US Open, partnering Ágnes Szávay.

She announced her retirement from professional tennis in January 2016.

Uhlířová now provides television commentary on the WTA Tour. She speaks several languages, and is therefore able to translate many of the non-English exchanges when on-court coaching takes place during matches.

Grand Slam doubles performance timeline

Significant finals

Premier Mandatory/Premier 5 tournaments

Doubles: 1 runner-up

WTA career finals

Doubles: 18 (5 titles, 13 runner-ups)

ITF finals

Singles: 1 (0–1)

Doubles: 29 (17–12)

References

External links 

 
 

1978 births
Living people
Sportspeople from České Budějovice
Czech female tennis players